Máiréad Nesbitt is an Irish musician. She is known for performing Celtic and classical music and being the former fiddler for  Celtic Woman. She was also one of the two original fiddlers in Michael Flatley’s Lord of the Dance in the mid to late 1990s, along with its extended version Feet of Flames in the early 2000s.

Background
Nesbitt was born to John and Kathleen Nesbitt, both music teachers in Co.Tipperary, Ireland. She has a sister, Frances, and four brothers, Seán, Michael, Noel and Karl, all of whom are musicians. She has been a piano player since the age of four, and began playing the violin at age six.

Her formal musical studies began at The Ursuline Convent in Thurles, County Tipperary and progressed through the Waterford Institute of Technology and the Cork School of Music, during which time she participated in the National Youth Orchestra of Ireland. Nesbitt completed postgraduate studies at Royal Academy of Music and Trinity College of Music in London under Emanuel Hurwitz.

Besides her family, Nesbitt has stated that her influences range from Itzhak Perlman and Michael Coleman to bluegrass artist Alison Krauss and rock's David Bowie and Sting.

Personal life
Nesbitt has been married to Jim Mustapha Jr., Celtic Woman's then-lighting director, since 2011.

Discography
 Solo
Raining Up (2001 UK Release; 2006 US Release)
Hibernia (December 2016)
 With Celtic Woman
Celtic Woman (March 2005)
Celtic Woman: A Christmas Celebration (October 2006)
Celtic Woman: A New Journey (January 2007)
Celtic Woman: The Greatest Journey (October 2008)
Celtic Woman: Songs from the Heart (January 2010)
Celtic Woman: Lullaby (February 2011)
Celtic Woman: Believe (May 2011, January 2012)
Celtic Woman: Home for Christmas (October 2012)
Celtic Woman: Emerald - Musical Gems (February 2014)
Celtic Woman: Destiny (October 2015)
Celtic Woman: The Best of Christmas (November 2017)
 With The Dhol Foundation
Drum-Believable (2005)
 Other contributions
Lord of the Dance (March 1997)
Feet of Flames (February 1999)
Tinker Bell (soundtrack) (October 2008)
Tinker Bell and the Lost Treasure (soundtrack) (September 2009)
Devil's Bit Sessions (June 2017)
Harmonious (soundtrack) (October 2021)

Filmography
Lord of the Dance (November 1999)
Celtic Woman (March 2005)
Celtic Woman: A New Journey (January 2007)
Celtic Woman: A Christmas Celebration (October 2007)
Celtic Woman: The Greatest Journey (October 2008)
Celtic Woman: Songs from the Heart (January 2010)
Celtic Woman: Believe (January 2012)
Celtic Woman: Home for Christmas (October 2013)
Celtic Woman: Emerald - Musical Gems (February 2014)
Celtic Woman: Destiny (October 2015)

References

External links

 
 
 

Celtic Woman members
20th-century Irish musicians
Irish fiddlers
Irish violinists
1979 births
Living people
Musicians from County Tipperary
Alumni of Trinity College of Music
Alumni of the Royal Academy of Music
Alumni of Waterford Institute of Technology
Alumni of Cork Institute of Technology
21st-century Irish musicians
20th-century Irish women musicians
21st-century Irish women musicians
20th-century violinists
21st-century violinists
Irish women violinists
Women violinists
Vertical Records artists